Calcium permanganate is an oxidizing agent and chemical compound with the chemical formula Ca(MnO4)2. This salt consists of the metal calcium and two permanganate ions.

Preparation 
The salt is prepared from the reaction of potassium permanganate with calcium chloride or from the reaction of aluminium permanganate with calcium oxide.  It can also be prepared by reacting manganese dioxide with a solution of calcium hypochlorite and a little bit of calcium hydroxide to increase the pH level.

Uses
Calcium permanganate is used in the textile industry, for sterilization of water, and as a deodorizer. It is believed to help whiten teeth. It was formerly used as a component of rocket fuel by the Luftwaffe.

Safety 
It is noncombustible, but being a strong oxidizing agent, it will accelerate the burning of combustible material. If the combustible material is finely divided, the resulting mixture may be explosive. Contact with liquid combustible materials may result in spontaneous ignition. Contact with sulfuric acid may cause fires or explosions. Mixtures with acetic acid or acetic anhydride can explode if not kept cold. Explosions can occur when mixtures of calcium permanganate and sulfuric acid come into contact with benzene, carbon disulfide, diethyl ether, ethyl alcohol, petroleum, or other organic matter.

See also
Potassium permanganate
Sodium permanganate
Ammonium permanganate

References

Calcium compounds
Permanganates
Oxidizing agents